Christopher Fairfield Edley Jr. (born January 13, 1953) was the Dean of the University of California, Berkeley School of Law from 2004 to 2013. He serves as President of the Opportunity Institute, an organization he co-founded with Hillary Clinton advisor Ann O'Leary.

Edley has been a leading figure in Democratic policy circles for four decades, serving as a senior member of five presidential campaigns, as an economic policy and budget official under Presidents Jimmy Carter and Bill Clinton, and as a chair of the Obama-Biden transition team. In 2011 he was appointed by U.S. Secretary of Education Arne Duncan as co-chair of the congressionally chartered National Commission on Equity and Excellence in Education.

He is married to Maria Echaveste, former deputy chief of staff for U.S. President Bill Clinton.

After receiving his undergraduate degree in mathematics from Swarthmore College he attended Harvard Law School, where he later served as a professor, teaching Administrative Law and founding the Harvard Civil Rights Project. He served as an advisor to President Clinton's One America Initiative, was a member of the United States Commission on Civil Rights, and chaired President Clinton's 1998 Affirmative Action Review.  In the 2008 presidential election, he supported and advised candidate Barack Obama, one of his former students at Harvard Law School. He was elected to the Common Cause National Governing Board in 2010. On August 16, 2013, he announced his intention to resign as Berkeley Law dean, effective December 31, 2013.

According to legal journalist Emily Bazelon, Edley "has written thoughtfully and moderately about affirmative action."

Published works

 
Administrative Law: Rethinking Judicial Control of Bureaucracy

References

External links

President Clinton's Affirmative Action Review, 1998
Faculty Bio

American legal scholars
African-American legal scholars
Deans of UC Berkeley School of Law
UC Berkeley School of Law faculty
Harvard Law School faculty
United States Commission on Civil Rights members
Clinton administration personnel
The Century Foundation
Harvard Law School alumni
Swarthmore College alumni
Activists from New Rochelle, New York
Lawyers from New Rochelle, New York
1951 births
Living people
New Rochelle High School alumni